Jon-Paul Tobin (born 22 March 1977) is a New Zealand competitive windsurfer. He was born in Whakatane. He placed 7th in windsurfing at the 2012 Summer Olympics in London. 

Tobin has twice previously been ranked No.1 in the world.

Achievements

References

External links
 
 
 
 
 

1977 births
Living people
New Zealand windsurfers
New Zealand male sailors (sport)
Olympic sailors of New Zealand
Sailors at the 2012 Summer Olympics – RS:X
Sportspeople from Whakatāne